Francesco d'Antonio or d'Antonio di Bartolomeo (born 1393, active until 1452) was an Italian painter of the Renaissance, mainly active in Florence. He is likely the same Francesco Fiorentino that Giorgio Vasari in his biographies states was a follower of Lorenzo Monaco. In 1429 Francesco joined the painters' guild in Florence. A triptych signed (circa 1415 - 1418) attributed to Francesco is found in the Fitzwilliam Museum, Cambridge. A painted depiction of the Virgin and Child with Six Angels and Two Cherubim (about 1440–50) on a gilded background found at the National Gallery, London. A panel titled Madonna and Child with Swallow (about 1420–25) attributed to the artist is found in the collection of the Denver Art Museum.

References

1393 births
1450s deaths
15th-century Italian painters
Painters from Florence
Quattrocento painters
Italian male painters
Renaissance painters